Suryakant Mandhare was an Indian actor,  in the Marathi film industries. Actor and artist Chandrakant Mandare is the elder brother of Suryakant.

Films as Actor

Dramas as actor
Suryakant acted in following Marathi Dramas

Awards
 Maharashtra Rajya Award - Swami 1963
 Hari Narayan Apte Award - Swami 1963
 Sahitya Akadami Award - Swami 1964
 Padmashri 1973
 Maharashtra Gaurav Puraskar 1990

References

Male actors in Marathi cinema
Male actors in Hindi cinema
20th-century Indian male actors
Year of birth missing
Place of birth missing
Male actors in Marathi theatre
Indian male stage actors
People from Kolhapur
Male actors from Maharashtra